Lina Pikčiutė (born 17 November 1990) is a Lithuanian basketball player who last played for KMKL club BC Neptūnas. During her career, she has won the Lithuanian Women's Basketball League five times and the Damen-Basketball-Bundesliga once. In 2013, she was named the Lithuanian Basketball Federation women's player of the year.

Playing career
During the 2014–2015 season, she played for Udominate Basket Umeå in the Swedish Basketligan dam, helping the team to the best record in the league. In the playoffs, Umeå lost to the Norrköping Dolphins in the finals. After winning her fifth LMKL title with Marijampolė Sūduva in 2017, she signed with CD Zamarat of the Spanish Liga Femenina for the 2017–2018 season.

In January 2019, Pikčiutė signed with Ciudad de los Adelantados of the Spanish LF2 and helped the team achieve promotion to the LF1. She continued to play in the LF2 the following season, signing with Laboratorios Ynsadiet Lagenes.

In May 2020, Pikčiutė signed with Úrvalsdeild kvenna club Fjölnir. On 3 October 2020, she had 29 points and 16 rebounds in a victory against Valur. During the regular season, Pikčiutė averaged 15.4 points and 12.5 rebounds per game, helping Fjölnir to an unexpected fourth place finish. During the playoffs she averaged 16.3 points and 7.7 rebounds in Fjölnir's first round loss against eventual champions Valur.

National team career
Pikčiutė debuted with the Lithuanian national team in 2013.

References

External links
SBL statistics
LMKL statistics
Spanish statistics
Icelandic statistics at Icelandic Basketball Association
Profile at Eurobasket.com

1990 births
Centers (basketball)
Living people
Lithuanian women's basketball players
Fjölnir women's basketball players
Úrvalsdeild kvenna basketball players